The 2017 Dubai Duty Free Darts Masters was the fifth staging of the tournament organised by the Professional Darts Corporation. It was the first World Series of Darts event of 2017. The tournament featured eight of the top players according to the PDC Order of Merit, competing in a knockout system. The tournament was be held at the Dubai Tennis Centre in Dubai over 24–25 May 2017.

Gary Anderson was the title defender after beating Michael van Gerwen 11–9 in the last year's final. He successfully defended his title after beating Michael van Gerwen in a repeat of the final 11–7.

The combined average in the final was 221.34, the highest total in a televised PDC final, beating the previous best of 217.15 by Phil Taylor and Adrian Lewis in the 2013 World Matchplay final.

Prize money
The total prize fund was £50,000.

Qualifiers
Eight players were invited by the Professional Darts Corporation were selected to compete. 5 of the top 6 players in the PDC Order of Merit prior to the event were invited - reigning event champion Gary Anderson, 2017 world champion Michael van Gerwen, 2017 UK Open winner Peter Wright, James Wade & Dave Chisnall - as were two former world champions - the sixteen-time champion Phil Taylor and five-time champion Raymond van Barneveld. The 2017 UK Open runner-up Gerwyn Price was the eighth player invited, making his World Series of Darts debut. Price was the only player not to have featured in the 2016 Dubai Duty Free Darts Masters event.

The top four players going into the event were seeded and were kept apart for the first round.
  Michael van Gerwen (Runner-up)
  Gary Anderson (Champion)
  Peter Wright (Semi-finals)
  James Wade (Quarter-finals)

The other four players were unseeded and drawn randomly among the top four seeds for the first round.
  Dave Chisnall (Quarter-finals)
  Gerwyn Price (Semi-finals)
  Phil Taylor (Quarter-finals)
  Raymond van Barneveld (Quarter-finals)

Draw

Broadcasting
The tournament was available in the following territories on these channels.

References

Dubai Duty Free Darts Masters
Dubai Duty Free Darts Masters
2017 in Emirati sport
World Series of Darts